Mather is an unincorporated community and census-designated place in Morgan Township, Greene County, Pennsylvania,  United States. According to the 2010 census, the population of Mather was 737.

Demographics

References

External links

Census-designated places in Greene County, Pennsylvania
Census-designated places in Pennsylvania